Víctor Miguel Valussi (8 May 1912 - 1 April 1995) was an Argentine football defender who won four league championships with Boca Juniors and played for the Argentina national team.

Playing career

Club
Valussi began his playing career in 1933 with Chacarita Juniors, in 1935 he joined reigning Argentine champions Boca Juniors and helped them to retain their championship in 1935. He made his debut for the club in a 2-1 home win against Vélez Sársfield on 17 March 1935.

In 1937 he spent a season with Club Atlético Tigre but returned to Boca the following year. He won three more championships with Boca in 1940, 1943 and 1944.

Valussi left Boca in 1945 after playing a total of 274 games for Boca in all competitions, he joined Mexican side Tampico Madero.

International
Valussi made 9 appearances for the Argentina national team, his debut came against Brazil on 18 February 1940 in a game which ended 2-2. He played in Copa América 1942.

Titles
Primera División Argentina (4): 1935, 1940, 1943, 1944

References

External links

 Biography at Informe Xeneize
 Statistics at Historia de Boca

1912 births
1995 deaths
People from Resistencia, Chaco
Argentine people of Italian descent
Argentine footballers
Argentina international footballers
Association football defenders
Chacarita Juniors footballers
Boca Juniors footballers
Club Atlético Tigre footballers
Argentine Primera División players
Argentine expatriate footballers
Expatriate footballers in Mexico
Sportspeople from Chaco Province